Alexeevca may refer to several places in Moldova:

 Alexeevca, Edineț, a commune in Edineț District
 Alexeevca, Florești, a commune in Florești District
 Alexeevca, Ungheni, a commune in Ungheni District
 Alexeevca, a village in Svetlîi Commune, Gagauzia